"Inbetweener" is a song by English Britpop band Sleeper, written by the band's vocalist and guitarist Louise Wener. It was the third single to be released from their debut album Smart in 1995 (see 1995 in British music). It was their breakthrough single, crashing daytime radio playlists and reaching #16 in the UK Singles Chart.

Louise Wener stated that "Inbetweener" was a reference to her upbringing in an English commuter town; "it's about where people live and what they do in suburbia, and it's about unfulfiled dreams".

Release
Indolent released "Inbetweener" across four single formats on 9 January 1995. A week later, "Inbetweener" debuted at number 16 on the UK singles chart and spent a further three weeks on the charts. According to Louise Wener, the record label had not pressed enough copies, so when the demand for the single was higher than expected, they could not restock record shops fast enough, resulting in a substantially lower chart position than indicated by the midweeks. Indolent reported to Billboard that the single sold 34,000 units in three weeks. The album release of Smart followed on 13 February.

The music video for "Inbetweener" was notable for featuring UK daytime television presenter Dale Winton (then of Supermarket Sweep fame) in a cameo appearance. He peers over shelves and shakes pipes of Pringles as if they're musical shakers, while the band perform in the supermarket aisles. For the North American market, Arista funded a second video shoot for the song.

Track listing
 
 
UK 12" single Indolent SLEEP 006T

"Inbetweener" – 3:02
"Little Annie" – 2:49
"Disco Duncan" – 3:30
"Bank"– 1:28

UK CD single Indolent SLEEP 006CD
EU CD maxi BMG 74321 25835-2

"Inbetweener" – 3:02
"Little Annie" – 2:49
"Disco Duncan" – 3:30

UK 7" single Indolent SLEEP 006
UK cassette single Indolent SLEEP 006MC

"Inbetweener" – 3:02
"Little Annie" – 2:49

All tracks written by Louise Wener.

Comprehensive Charts

References

External links
"Inbetweener" music video
"Inbetweener" music video (U.S. version)
Sleeper @ BBC Music
Sleeper release discography @ We Heart Music

1995 singles
Sleeper (band) songs
Songs written by Louise Wener
1994 songs